Playin' for Keeps is the third album by Canadian country music singer Jason McCoy.

Track listing

 "Born Again in Dixieland (Jason McCoy, Naoise Sheridan, Denny Carr) – 3:25
 "A Little Bit of You" (Craig Wiseman, McCoy, Sonny Burgess) – 2:56
 "There's More Where That Came From" (McCoy, Naoise Sheridan, Denny Carr) – 4:16
 "Dare You to Do That Again" (Scott Baggett, McCoy, S. Rice) – 2:59
 "Heaven Help Her Heart" (McCoy, Odie Blackmon) – 3:13
 "Out of This Town Alive" (McCoy, Blackmon) – 3:15
 "Perfect Disguise" (McCoy, C. Curtis) – 3:47
 "Doin' It Right" (Tom Lavin) – 2:52
 "This Could Take All Night" (McCoy, Carr) – 3:18
 "Get a Real Job" (McCoy, Al Anderson) – 2:42
 "Forever and a Day" (McCoy, Carr) – 3:17
 "I'm Gonna Make Her Mine" (McCoy, Chris Lindsey) – 3:17

Chart performance

Jason McCoy albums
1997 albums
Universal Records albums